The 900 is a bus service which operates between Edinburgh and Glasgow.

History
24-hour operation was introduced on 2 October 2017. In January 2020, 18 double-decker Plaxton Panorama coaches were introduced, replacing the single-deck coaches that previously operated on the route.

Operation 
The route is operated under the Scottish Citylink brand by Stagecoach West Scotland and Park's of Hamilton. It operates every 15 minutes during the day, every 30 minutes in the evening, and hourly overnight.

Calling points 

 Edinburgh bus station (early morning journeys start on St David Street instead)
 Haymarket railway station
 Corstorphine (opposite Edinburgh Zoo)
 Edinburgh Airport (early morning journeys only)
 Ratho Station
 Livingston Deer Park (early morning journeys only)
 Heart of Scotland services
 Eurocentral (all early morning journeys, alternates with Baillieston during daytimes and evenings)
 Baillieston (daytimes and evenings only, alternates with Eurocentral)
 Buchanan bus station, Glasgow

References

Bus routes in Scotland
Airport bus services